Patrick William Sá de Oliveira (born 3 June 1997) is a Brazilian professional footballer who plays as a defender for the Primeira Liga club Rio Ave F.C.

Professional career
Patrick William made his professional debut with Ceará in a 1–0 Campeonato Brasileiro Série A loss to Cruzeiro on 3 June 2018. On 25 June 2019, he signed a professional contract for 5 years with Famalicão in the Portuguese Primeira Liga.

On 17 August 2021, he joined Estoril on loan.

References

External links
 

1997 births
Living people
People from São Leopoldo
Brazilian footballers
Association football defenders
Vila Nova Futebol Clube players
Ceará Sporting Club players
Tupi Football Club players
F.C. Famalicão players
G.D. Estoril Praia players
Rio Ave F.C. players
Primeira Liga players
Campeonato Brasileiro Série A players
Campeonato Brasileiro Série B players
Campeonato Brasileiro Série C players
Brazilian expatriate footballers
Expatriate footballers in Portugal
Brazilian expatriate sportspeople in Portugal
Sportspeople from Rio Grande do Sul